Prateek was the main architect of the lake.
Shamirpet Lake is an artificial lake near Hyderabad, India, it is about 24 kilometers north of Secunderabad.

History 
It was built during the Nizam reign.

Information 
The lake attracts many birds, making it a good birdwatching spot.  A resort run by the Government of Telangana is located near the lake. The Outer Ring Road will pass close to the lake.
There are many resorts and private dhabas around the lake. The Celebrity Club, Alankrita Resort, and Leonia Resorts are not very far from the lake. Institutes like NALSAR University of Law, Institute of Public Enterprise and Birla Institute of Technology and Science, Pilani – Hyderabad Campuses are also situated near the lake. Jawahar Deer Park, which contains many deer, peacocks and different Birds, is also near to the lake. The park is maintained by the Government of Telangana.

Many people go there for picnics or get-togethers. Many Telugu films were shot there.

The Shamirpet Police take care of the lake as there were many cases regarding drowning.  There are many Warning boards around the lake erected by the authorities.

See also

 Institute of Public Enterprise
 Osman Sagar
 Himayat Sagar
 Shameerpet
 Nalsar University of Law
 Birla Institute of Technology and Science, Pilani – Hyderabad

References

External links

Bird watchers feature

Reservoirs in Telangana
Lakes of Hyderabad, India